Yoav Raanan (יואב רענן; born 15 January 1928) is an Israeli former Olympic diver. He was born in Cairo, Egypt.

Diving career
Raanan competed for Israel at the 1952 Summer Olympics, at the age of 24, in Helsinki, coming in 9th in Men's Springboard and 24th in Men's Platform. It was Israel's first appearance in the Olympic Games. He won a gold medal in high diving at the 1953 Maccabiah Games.

Raanan participated for Israel at the 1954 Asian Games in Manila, Philippines, in diving, winning the gold medal in 3 m springboard and the silver medal in 10 m platform. He competed again for Israel at the 1956 Summer Olympics, at the age of 28, in Melbourne, coming in 22nd in Men's Springboard. Raanan was one of only three competitors representing Israel in those Games, as they took place weeks after the Sinai War.

References

External links

1928 births
Possibly living people
Olympic divers of Israel
Divers at the 1956 Summer Olympics
Asian Games gold medalists for Israel
Asian Games silver medalists for Israel
Sportspeople from Cairo
Israeli male divers
Divers at the 1952 Summer Olympics
Divers at the 1954 Asian Games
Egyptian emigrants to Israel
Asian Games medalists in diving
Medalists at the 1954 Asian Games
Maccabiah Games competitors by sport
Competitors at the 1953 Maccabiah Games
Maccabiah Games gold medalists for Israel
20th-century Israeli people